The Minister for Agriculture, Food and the Marine is a senior minister in the Government of Ireland and leads the Department of Agriculture, Food and the Marine. Historically, the agriculture portfolio has gone under a number of different names; the holder has often borne the title of simply Minister for Agriculture.

The current Minister for Agriculture, Food and the Marine is Charlie McConalogue. He is assisted by two Ministers of State:
Senator Pippa Hackett – Minister of State for Land Use and Biodiversity
Martin Heydon, TD – Minister of State for  Research & Development, Farm Safety and New Market Development

Functions
The department's functions include:
Policy advice and development on all areas of departmental responsibility
Representation in international especially European Union and national negotiations;
Development and implementation of national and EU schemes in support of agriculture, fisheries, forestry and rural development.
Monitoring and controlling aspects of food safety.
Control and audit of public expenditure under its control.
Regulation of the agriculture, fisheries and food industries through national and EU law.
Monitoring and controlling animal and plant health and animal welfare.
Monitoring and direction of state bodies engaged in the following areas:
Research training and advice.
Market development and promotion.
Industry regulation and development.
Commercial activities. 
Direct provision of support services to agriculture, fisheries and forestry.

List of office-holders

Note

References

External links
Department of Agriculture, Food and the Marine

Lists of government ministers of Ireland
Agriculture in the Republic of Ireland
Ireland
Fishing in Ireland
Government ministers of the Republic of Ireland
Ireland
Minister